Jules Defrance was a Belgian racing cyclist. He won the Belgian national road race title in 1902.

References

External links

Year of birth missing
Year of death missing
Belgian male cyclists
Place of birth missing